Aline Pellegrino (born July 6, 1982), commonly known as Aline, is a Brazilian former footballer who played as a defender for Russian club WFC Rossiyanka and several clubs in her native Brazil. She was a member of the Brazil national team that won the silver medal at the 2004 Summer Olympics and competed at the 2007 FIFA Women's World Cup. She was made captain of the national team in 2006.

In August 2011 she joined Russian Champions League contestant WFC Rossiyanka.

International career

Aline missed the 2008 Beijing Olympics after suffering a knee ligament injury in a pre-tournament friendly against South Korea. She had helped to secure Brazil's place at the tournament, by scoring in a 5–1 win over Ghana at a CONMEBOL–CAF play-off staged at Beijing's Workers Stadium. Brazil had been forced into the play-off after their shock defeat by Argentina at the 2006 South American Women's Football Championship.

International goals

References

External links

 
 Profile at Santos FC 

1982 births
Living people
Brazilian women's footballers
Olympic footballers of Brazil
Olympic silver medalists for Brazil
Footballers at the 2004 Summer Olympics
Footballers at the 2012 Summer Olympics
Women's association football defenders
Footballers from São Paulo
2007 FIFA Women's World Cup players
2011 FIFA Women's World Cup players
Olympic medalists in football
Santos FC (women) players
Brazilian expatriate women's footballers
Expatriate women's footballers in Russia
Brazilian expatriates in Russia
WFC Rossiyanka players
Medalists at the 2004 Summer Olympics
Brazil women's international footballers
Pan American Games medalists in football
Footballers at the 2007 Pan American Games
Pan American Games gold medalists for Brazil
Medalists at the 2007 Pan American Games